Lents is a neighborhood in the Southeast section of Portland, Oregon.

Lents may also refer to:
Lents (crater)
Lents Town Center/Southeast Foster Road
Lent Bumps or Lents, a set of rowing races held annually Cambridge

People with the surname
 Lisa Lents (b. 1986), Danish TV personality

See also
Lent (disambiguation)